This is a list of all personnel changes for the 2021 Indian Premier League.

Pre-auction
The BCCI set the deadline of 20 January 2021 for the list of retained and released players. The trading window remained open till 11 February 2021 and was closed for one week, before being reopened on 19 February 2021.

Transfers

 ↓: Player(s) was/were swapped with the player(s) mentioned in the next row(s).
 ↑: Player(s) was/were swapped with the player(s) mentioned in the previous row(s).
 REP: Players who were unsold originally in the 2020 auction but were later signed up as a replacement player.

Released players
The released players were announced on 20 January 2021. Steve Smith, Aaron Finch and Glenn Maxwell were the prominent names among the released players. Piyush Chawla, the costliest Indian player at the 2020 auction, was also released.

 REP: Players who were unsold originally in the 2020 auction but were later signed up as a replacement player.

Retained players 
The retained players were announced on 20 January 2021.

 REP: Players who were unsold originally in the 2020 auction but were later signed up as a replacement player.

Summary

Auction 
The auction was conducted on 18 February 2021 in Chennai. A total of 1097 players initially registered for the auction of which 292 were selected for the auction, including 125 overseas players and three players from associate nations.

Sold players

Withdrawn players
The following players withdrew from the tournament either due to injuries or because of other reasons.

Bold – Players returned for UAE leg. Players listed as their replacements were put into the available players pool.

Support staff changes

Notes

References

Indian Premier League personnel changes
2021 Indian Premier League